Jason Hartman is a singer-songwriter and the 2009 co-winner of season 5 of the Idols (South Africa). After a malfunction occurred with the text lines in the finals, it was decided that even though Jason was the official winner of Idols, the title would be shared between him and the runner up Sasha Lee Davids.

Early career 
Jason started his career back in 1996 whilst, still at school, playing in a young three-piece rock band called Triad before moving on to Samson Show Band, made up of him, his brother and father. Playing in the Samson Band enabled Jason to tour all over Southern Africa including Zimbabwe and Botswana.

In July 2003, Jason and his brother (Scott Hartman), father (Sam Hartman) and band-mate Donovan Thatcher formed the band Men of Trees. Men of Trees played music from many genres. Their repertoire included Counting Crows, Sting, Bob Marley and much more.

Idols 
Jason auditioned for Idols season 5 in Johannesburg even though he is originally from the KZN midlands. All judges seemed impressed with him but all thought his age would be a disadvantage as the contest caters for young contestants and all judges thought he would battle to get noticed with the young crowd. However he was put through to the theater week where he progressed into the Top 14. From the Top 10 onwards he was a contender that had not landed up in the bottom three once. A favourite to win. Unfortunately there was a mix up with late votes arriving after the cutoff time on the night of the finale. The sms's had been sent before the cutoff time but were received only after the deadline. M-Net made the public aware of the matter within a day and assured everyone that a recount of the votes would be done as soon as possible. The recount showed that Jason won, with 1.3 million votes, or 54% of the total. Sasha-Lee Davids came second, with 1.1 million votes, or 46%. M-Net decided that "200,000 votes are not significant enough, and the results so close, the only fair thing to do under the circumstances is to declare a tie", thus giving Jason and Sasha-Lee the same prizes. This was a first in the Idols competition and created extensive media coverage at the time.

Performances/Results

Post-Idols

Misunderstandings 

After the matter of the votes was resolved many magazines and newspapers managed to twist Jason's comments, making the public believe that he wanted Sasha Lee to give up her prizes and title of co-winner. Jason stated he meant nothing of the sort and that everybody was twisting his own words. Despite this he and Sasha-Lee are still good friends. In mid-May 2009 rumors began to circulate that Jason would not sign his recording deal unless his former band were signed as well. However this was not true with Jason saying: "What a load of crap. I’m performing with my band in the meantime, and will sign my deal. I don’t know where people get this from." He has continued performing with his band and has on various occasions played as a duo with his father, Sam, on two guitars.

Success 

After being declared as joint winner for Idols Jason played many concerts for sold out audiences.  Jason's single "Break the Silence" hit the local airwaves and seemed to meet with favorable reviews. The single entered South Africa's newly created chart the Nokia Top 40 SA, peaking at number 1 as of 13 June 2009. The album On the Run was released in October 2009. Jason wrote most of the songs himself and co wrote with his Producer, Marius Brouwer. The single on the Run went to Number 1 on Radio Stations and was rated at Number 28 in the overall 5FM 2009 singles. "Break the Silence" was number 22 on 94.7 for 2009. His video, On The Run, can be viewed on YouTube or Facebook and his website. The video has had rave reviews. 

Jason`s third single "Chasing Stars" climbed well up the charts and enjoyed air play on all radio stations throughout South Africa.

Jason, alongside co-winner Sasha Lee, opened for Wayne Brady's Making It Up Tour South African leg.

Jason and his band were the opening act in March 2010 for Kelly Clarkson, the original American Idol, on her world tour which included South Africa. They played to thousands of fans in Cape Town, Johannesburg and Durban. In June 2011, he and his band were invited to play as the opening act for The Eagles during the wedding celebrations of Prince Albert and Charlene Wittstock in Monaco, and received a standing ovation from 40,000 people. The band played live at The Grand Prix during the same time.

Between performances on stage, Jason was chosen to play the lead role in A Million Colours, the follow-up to the e'Lollipop movie, a story made famous in the 1970s. The movie was filmed mainly in Johannesburg in 2010 and is based on the true story of the lives of the two previous stars of e'Lollipop and how "life unfolded" for them after their climb to fame. Initially skeptical about his acting abilities, Jason joined the cast as the lead role, embracing the new experience. The film, produced by Andre Pieterse of Ma Africa Productions and directed by Peter Bishau from Canada, was released in September 2011 at Toronto Film Festival. In October 2011, A Million Colours was chosen to open the Hollywood Black Film Festival in LA. Jason and Wandile Molabatsi, alongside Muntu Ndebele (whose true life story is depicted in the movie)walked the red carpet as actors for the first foreign film chosen to open The Hollywood Black Film Festival. The Movie opened in South Africa on 26 April 2012.

Jason`s first movie sound track, "I'm Alive", co-written by Marius Brower and Sir Tim Rice, is one of the sound tracks of the animated movie "Jock" (Jock of the Bushveld), released in August 2011. This is the first 3D movie to be created in South Africa.

Jason was intent on creating his own image, not necessarily that of an Idol but rather that of a respected musician with a top class band. He has huge respect for the Idols competition and stated many times, that he was grateful for the exposure he received, giving him the platform he needed to further his career. To have achieved this on his own would have been extremely difficult in today`s music industry, he acknowledges.

Second album 
Jason has been working on his second album which has been due for release in 2013. His band remains the same and involves Scott Hartman (brother) on drums and vocals, Sam Hartman (father) on guitar, Quinton Askes on Bass and Jason on Vocals and lead guitar. His Godfather, Sez Amamson, a renowned musician in his own right, plays with the band for large functions and is featured on the new album, on pedal steel guitar.

Jason released his first single off his album Say My Name, in November 2011. The song reached the semi-final status in the International Song Writing Competition based in Nashville, USA.

Personal life

Jason is the older of two brothers from parents Lyn Hartman and Sam Hartman. His parents divorced when he was 5 years old and the two boys moved with their mother from Pietermaritzburg in Natal to Johannesburg. His junior school started in Johannesburg and he then moved to the Natal Midlands where he was a boarder at school until he completed matric. Very sporty, he excelled at cricket, tennis, fishing and golf. He came from a long line of farming stock which instilled a love of nature and he learnt, at a young age, to communicate in fairly fluent Zulu. His brother, Scott, has been, what he termed as "the heart beat behind the band" and played in the family band as the drummer since an early age. His mother, Lyn Hartman, managed the band post Idols.

Jason was given the Freedom of Howick alongside fellow Idols contestant, Pixie Bennett, in May 2009. The only other person given this honour was Nelson Mandela many years previously.

On 30 June 2011, Jason Hartman performed for the pre-concert before the wedding of Prince Albert II of Monaco with Miss Charlene Wittstock.

Charity
Jason has always firmly believed in keeping the world a greener place and he does this by teaching disadvantaged communities on how to grow sustainable green gardens and planting trees.
Jason has his own Charity being Men Of Trees, an international organisation with branches all over the world. He has been sponsored by many corporates and ploughed any spare time he has had into starting food gardens, throughout the country, focusing on schools and townships. His father, Sam, has been a great motivator in this drive and the SABC has featured them in their plight to alleviate poverty by growing food.

In October 2011, Jason started Conservation Guardians with several other board members based internationally. This is an initiative to assist against poaching, in particular rhino poaching as well as other environmental issues in southern Africa. He has worked extensively to raise funds which will assist his sustainable food growing projects in southern Africa. Jason performed for his first fund raising event for Conservation Guardians, in Monaco, in April 2012 which raised 80,000 euros for the charity. He and his brother, Scott, have attended courses on tracking wildlife and prefer to be "action" driven as opposed to being only mouthpieces.

In April 2013, Jason and Dave Estment, ex Springbok Super Biker Racing Champion, embarked on a 15,000-kilometer bike ride across southern Africa to raise funds for conservation, accompanied by Jason`s band and crew. The tour, Rock `n Ride for Rhino (www.rnr4r.org) targeted private schools throughout the country, raising awareness on environmental issues amongst the youth.

Gallery

References

21st-century South African male singers
South African guitarists
Male guitarists
1979 births
Living people
Idols South Africa winners
21st-century guitarists